The 2023 Orlando Pride season will be Orlando Pride's eighth season in the National Women's Soccer League, the top division of women's soccer in the United States.

Notable events 
On November 11, 2022, Seb Hines was confirmed as permanent head coach having acted as interim head coach from June 7, 2022, following the suspension of Amanda Cromwell. In the same announcement, it was stated Ian Fleming had been removed as general manager after 24 months in the role. Haley Carter was named as general manager and VP of soccer operations on January 30, 2023.

On February 28, 2023, having played the previous season wearing white shorts as part of the secondary kit, the club announced they were making the switch to black shorts to make players more comfortable when playing during their menstrual cycle. They became the first NWSL team to do this. Additionally, the names and numbers on the back of the jerseys were changed from silver to the more visible black.

Roster

Staff 
.

Match results

Friendlies
Five friendly matches were scheduled with all but one played behind closed doors.

National Women's Soccer League

The NWSL regular season will be played on a balanced schedule i.e. each team will play every other team twice; once at home and once away. The top six teams will qualify for the playoffs with the top two receiving a first-round bye.

Results summary

Results by round

Results

NWSL Challenge Cup 

Unlike previous seasons, the 2023 NWSL Challenge Cup schedule will be spread across the season with the group stage played between April and August. There wil be three groups each containing four teams, with each team playing a six-game round robin home and away series. The top team from each group will progress to the semifinals along with the highest-ranked group runner-up. Orlando were once again paired in the East region with Washington Spirit, North Carolina Courage and NJ/NY Gotham FC.

Squad statistics

Appearances

Starting appearances are listed first, followed by substitute appearances after the + symbol where applicable.

|-
! colspan=12 style=background:#dcdcdc; text-align:center|Goalkeepers

|-
! colspan=12 style=background:#dcdcdc; text-align:center|Defenders

|-
! colspan=12 style=background:#dcdcdc; text-align:center|Midfielders

|-
! colspan=12 style=background:#dcdcdc; text-align:center|Forwards

|}

Transfers and loans

2023 NWSL Draft 

Draft picks are not automatically signed to the team roster. The 2023 college draft was held on January 12, 2023. Orlando made five selections.

Transfers in

Transfers out

Preseason trialists 
Orlando Pride began preseason training on January 30, 2023. The squad included three non-roster invitees on trial with the team during preseason. Reiss returned to Orlando having played with the Pride during the previous season before her contract expired. Nicole Baxter was a free agent having been at NJ/NY Gotham FC since 2019. McKinley Crone was an undrafted rookie out of the University of Alabama. A further three trialists appeared during a preseason friendly against Kansas City Current on February 23: Jamaican international defender Konya Plummer returned having not played since her release by Orlando Pride in 2021, undrafted rookie Maliah Morris out of Clemson University, and Channing Foster who had been waived by Chicago Red Stars at the end of her rookie season in 2022. Undrafted rookie defender Brianna Martinez, who played five seasons at Notre Dame before being drafted by Racing Louisville FC in 2023, was also later added as a non-roster invitee during preseason.

References

External links 

 

2023 National Women's Soccer League season
2023
American soccer clubs 2023 season
2023 in sports in Florida